Bishanchander Seth is an Indian politician.  He was elected to the Lok Sabha, the lower house of the Parliament of India  as a member of the Hindu Mahasabha.

References

External links
Official biographical sketch in Parliament of India website

1909 births
Year of death missing
Lok Sabha members from Uttar Pradesh
India MPs 1957–1962
India MPs 1962–1967
Hindu Mahasabha politicians